Justice is an online (shopjustice.com) clothing and lifestyle retailer targeting the tween girl market, formerly owned by Tween Brands, Inc. (formerly known as Limited Too, Inc. and Too, Inc.), later by Ascena Retail Group, and currently by Bluestar Alliance LLC.

Justice sells apparel, underwear, sleepwear, swimwear, lifestyle, accessories, and personal care products for girls age roughly 6–12. Justice formerly 
operated in malls and shopping centers. Tween Brands operated 900 Justice stores at the time of its acquisition by DressBarn, many of which were converted from Limited Too during 2008 to 2010.

Justice operates "Club Justice" as a loyalty program. You can earn points and redeem these points for discounts on purchases. Justice also sold licensed merchandise from popular Nickelodeon and Disney Channel franchises, such as iCarly, Victorious, Wizards of Waverly Place, and Liv and Maddie.

Justice carried girls size 6 through size 20, as well as plus sizes for size 10–24. Plus sized dresses, tops and jackets are available online and select styles in store.

Justice had over 1,000 stores at its peak in March 2016. These stores were mainly located in Canada and the United States of America, however, some stores were located in Mexico, Central America, South America, Asia, Australia, and the Middle East. Since August 2021 Walmart Canada began carrying Justice line at 326 across Canada.

History 
Limited Too was created by The Limited, Inc. in 1987 as a younger girls/infants version of The Limited. From 1987 to 1995, the number of stores increased from two to 288 different retail locations. In 1996, a new senior management team refocused Limited Too into a preteen girls fashion store. In 1999, Limited Too, Inc. spun off to establish a strong and independent brand identity.

From 2001 to 2003 the company operated the Mishmash chain that targeted 15- to 20-year-old women and sold apparel, accessories, and gifts and competed head-to-head with chains like Gadzooks, Wet Seal, and the women's businesses of Abercrombie & Fitch, Hollister Co., and American Eagle Outfitters. The chain folded in 2003 because Too Inc. felt that they knew and understood the preteen customer better. Committed to this focus, Too Inc. launched the first Justice: Just for Girls stores in January 2004; many of the early Justice stores were in converted Mishmash stores.

On July 10, 2006, Too Inc. completed its name change to Tween Brands, Inc., and began trading on the NYSE under the symbol, 'TWB'. In February 2008, there were 582 Limited Too stores in 47 states and Puerto Rico as well as 25 franchised stores in the Middle East. At its peak, Limited Too had over 600 stores, many of which were converted to the Justice brand between December 2008 and June 2010.

On June 25, 2009, Dressbarn announced that it would buy Tween Brands, Inc, in a friendly acquisition. In 2010, Tween Brands began a boys clothing line entitled “Brothers”. Clothing from Brothers was initially sold online only, but was eventually sold in select Justice stores as well as standalone Brothers stores.

On January 1, 2011, Dress Barn completed its reorganization into Ascena Retail Group, Inc. trading on the NASDAQ under the stock ticker symbol .

In 2012, Brothers clothing began being sold in several Justice stores. Over 20 Justice stores sold Brothers clothing by 2013. The Brothers headquarters is located in Ohio. By June 2012, the number of Justice stores had increased to 920. The chain outsold the much larger Walmart and Target stores in the girls' apparel category during the fourth quarter of 2011 and the first quarter of 2012.

On February 17, 2015, Ascena Retail Group, Inc. announced that the Brothers brand would be discontinued due to poor sales and recognition. Justice later added more product lines in response to changing consumer tastes, including Justice Active inspired by athleisure trends, with products endorsed by Mackenzie Ziegler, as well as JoJo Siwa clothing and accessories.

In 2018, Justice launched an original series of graphic novels and toys called Ultra Squad designed to be empowering to tween girls; the book series was well received and is currently on its fourth volume.

As part of Ascena Retail Group's bankruptcy reorganization in July 2020, 600 Justice locations are slated to close, leaving around 100 open. Ascena also announced that the Justice brand will also solely focus on online sales. Additionally, Justice has exited international markets due to the bankruptcy of Ascena Retail Group. On September 24, 2020, Justice announced an additional 23 Justice stores will be closing, leaving 83 stores by the end of October. On October 22, 2020, Ascena announced the remaining 83 Justice stores will also be closing as a part of their bankruptcy filing.

On November 11, 2020, Ascena Retail Group announced that the Justice brand was acquired by Bluestar Alliance LLC. The final remaining Justice stores closed on December 17, 2020, after months of liquidation sales, marking an end to a 33-year legacy for the once-dominant clothing retailer. The remaining assets of the Justice brand was sold to Premier Brands Group in December 2020.

In 2021, Justice relaunched the Shopjustice.com website under its new owners. The brand began to be sold at Walmart stores. This fills the void left by their brand stores that closed in 2020.

Criticism 
Justice was examined in the study “’Putting on’ Sexiness: A Content Analysis of the Presence of Sexualizing Characteristics in Girls' Clothing”. A total of 650 clothing pieces were analyzed into four groups defined as childish, sexual, both childish and sexual and neither childish nor sexual. Of the clothing documented, 413 pieces or 63.5% of the clothing was defined as childish, 12 pieces or 1.8% of the clothing was defined as sexual, and 225 pieces or 34.6% of the clothing was considered both childish and sexual. No clothing from Justice was considered neither childish nor sexual.

References

External links
Official Justice website

Companies based in the Columbus, Ohio metropolitan area
Companies formerly listed on the New York Stock Exchange
Children's clothing retailers
Retail companies established in 2004
2004 establishments in Ohio
American companies established in 2004